Marie Litzinger (May 14, 1899 – April 7, 1952) was an American mathematician known for her research in number theory, homogeneous polynomials, and modular arithmetic.

Early life and education 
Marie Litzinger was born in Bedford, Pennsylvania, the daughter of Rush Litzinger and Katherine O'Connell Litzinger. Her father owned a marble works, and was an accountant for the Pennsylvania Railroad.

Litzinger earned her bachelor's degree and master's degree at Bryn Mawr College in 1920 and 1922, respectively. She won the college's European Fellowship in 1920. She completed her Ph.D. at the University of Chicago in 1934. Her doctoral advisor was Leonard Eugene Dickson, one of the first American researchers in abstract algebra. Her dissertation was titled "A Basis for Residual Polynomials in n Variables."

Career 
While studying, Litzinger taught mathematics at secondary institutions, before becoming an instructor at Mount Holyoke College in 1925, where she remained for the rest of her career and rose to the rank of full professor in 1942. She also served as department chair. She was a member of the American Mathematical Society, among other professional societies.

Personal life 
Litzinger died in her hometown, Bedford, Pennsylvania, in 1952, aged 52 years.

References 

1899 births
1952 deaths
American women mathematicians
Bryn Mawr College alumni
University of Chicago alumni
Mount Holyoke College faculty
20th-century American mathematicians
20th-century women mathematicians
20th-century American women